Melquíades Álvarez may refer to:
 Melquíades Álvarez (politician) (1864–1936), Spanish Republican politician
 Melquíades Álvarez (swimmer) (born 1988), Spanish swimmer